Antonio Franchi (10 April 1936 – 30 July 2019) was an Italian racing cyclist. He rode in the 1964 Tour de France.

References

External links
 

1936 births
2019 deaths
Italian male cyclists
Place of birth missing
Sportspeople from the Province of Teramo
Cyclists from Abruzzo